In mathematics, a normed algebra A is an algebra over a field which has a sub-multiplicative norm:

 

Some authors require it to have a multiplicative identity 1 such that ║1║ = 1.

See also
 Banach algebra
 Composition algebra
 Division algebra
 Gelfand–Mazur theorem
 Hurwitz's theorem (composition algebras)

External reading

Algebras